Doug Bartlett (born May 22, 1963) is a former American football defensive tackle and defensive end. He played for the Philadelphia Eagles in 1988.

References

1963 births
Living people
Sportspeople from Springfield, Illinois
Players of American football from Illinois
American football defensive tackles
American football defensive ends
Northern Illinois Huskies football players
Philadelphia Eagles players